The Nidd Aqueduct is an aqueduct or  man-made watercourse in North Yorkshire, England.  It feeds water from Angram and Scar House reservoirs in upper Nidderdale, North Yorkshire  to Bradford in West Yorkshire. The aqueduct supplies  of water per day to Chellow Heights water treatment works. The aqueduct and the reservoirs it connects to are all maintained by Yorkshire Water.

History 
In 1892 Parliamentary Powers were granted for the City of Bradford to dam the River Nidd and its tributary Stone Beck in upper Nidderdale, and to build a conduit that delivered the water by gravity to Chellow Heights in Bradford. As Bradford has no major rivers running through it, the city needed fresh water for drinking and to be able to process wool (fulling). At that time, both Nidderdale and Bradford were in the West Riding of Yorkshire.

The first two reservoirs, Hayden Carr and Gouthwaite, were constructed in the early 1890s.  Work started at Hayden Carr in 1894 by Morrison and Mason of Edinburgh.  In 1893 John Best & Son started at Gouthwaite Reservoir further downstream, a compensation reservoir constructed so that the water supply to the lower Nidd valley would not be interrupted by work on the upper dams. In 1904 Bradford Water Works Corporation initiated the building of the next reservoir in the scheme in upper Nidderdale.  Angram reservoir was also constructed by John Best & Son, to a design by Bradford's city engineer, James Watson. The aqueduct was constructed by Morrison & Mason Ltd.

When Angram was nearing completion, Bradford Corporation decided to construct a larger dam at Scar House, which would incorporate and submerge the Hayden Carr reservoir.  Scar House Reservoir was started in 1920 with direct labour under the control of James Watson's successor, Lewis Mitchell, and completed in 1936.  The new reservoir required the construction of a new tunnel from Scar House to How Stean Beck, which was started in 1929 by the Hoare family.

Route 
The aqueduct starts downstream of Scar House Reservoir, after the screening chamber on the south bank, a short distance east of the dam, at Ordnance Survey grid reference SE 06820 76880. (The screening chamber is shown on OS 25,000 map but not on 50,000 map). It crosses the River Wharfe on the Barden Aqueduct Bridge, between Barden and Bolton Abbey, and then Barden Beck near Barden Beck Bridge. It then heads across open land again, crosses the A59 at Bolton Abbey Railway Station and runs adjacent to Chelker Reservoir above Addingham.

The aqueduct then descends into Airedale and crosses first the Leeds Liverpool Canal over Mauds Bridge in Bingley, then Bingley South Bog Site of Special Scientific Interest.  It passes underneath the A650 dual carriageway and crosses the River Aire at Cottingley. It then goes up to Chellow Heights where the water is stored.

Construction 
The route of the aqueduct is mostly sub-surface, apart from some small sections that drain water into the aqueduct. The route is entirely fed by gravity and the use of syphons. These also pick water up from other becks and streams in Nidderdale that the aqueduct crosses.

The only evidence of the aqueduct is in the various crossing bridges and syphons where the route goes across other bodies of water.  Most of the exposed sections of the aqueduct have crenellated walls and towers. The bridge over the River Wharfe at Barden Beck is now used by walkers on the Dales Way. A pump was installed at Barden on the River Wharfe that is capable of abstracting  of water a day into the Nidd Aqueduct and bolster the supply to Bradford.

This was beneficial to the lead miners there as it would drain away excess water from their mineworkings.

Another pipe was added alongside the original in 1920. Ten years later, the original pipe was found to be  out of alignment where it runs underneath Bingley South Bog. The 1920 pipe is elevated above the bog on concrete supports, but the original pipe was laid  down underneath the bog surface. The pressure from the bog was forcing the pipe out of alignment and was in danger of interrupting the water supply.

References

External links 

Link to OpenStreetMap with overlay of route onto imagery

Aqueducts in England
Water supply and sanitation in England and Wales
Nidderdale
Buildings and structures in North Yorkshire
Buildings and structures in West Yorkshire